Michael B. Fossel, M.D., Ph.D. (born 1950, Greenwich, Connecticut) is a former professor of clinical medicine at Michigan State University and is the author of several books on aging, who is best known for his views on telomerase therapy as a possible treatment for cellular senescence.  Fossel has appeared on many major news programs to discuss aging and has appeared regularly on National Public Radio (NPR).  He is also a respected lecturer, author, and the founder and former editor-in-chief of the Journal of Anti-Aging Medicine (now known as Rejuvenation Research).

Prior to earning his M.D. at Stanford Medical School, Fossel earned a joint B.A. (cum laude) and M.A. in psychology at Wesleyan University and a Ph.D. in neurobiology at Stanford University. He is also a graduate of Phillips Exeter Academy. Prior to graduating from medical school in 1981, he was awarded a National Science Foundation fellowship and taught at Stanford University.

In addition to his position at Michigan State University, Fossel has lectured at the National Institute for Health, the Smithsonian Institution, and at various other universities and institutes in various parts of the world. Fossel served on the board of directors for the American Aging Association and was their executive director.

Fossel has written numerous articles on aging and ethics for the Journal of the American Medical Association and In Vivo, and his first book, entitled Reversing Human Aging was published in 1996. The book garnered favorable reviews from mainstream newspapers as well as Scientific American. A magisterial academic textbook by Fossel entitled Cells, Aging, and Human Disease was published in 2004 by Oxford University Press. In 2015, he published "The Telomerase Revolution", which was lauded by both the Wall Street Journal and The London Times as one of the best science books of the year. To date, he has published more than 100 articles, chapters, and books on clinical medicine and age-related disease. Elsevier Publishing has contracted him to write and edit an updated textbook on the aging process, reversing cell aging, and the prospects for curing age-related disease, which is due out in 2024.

Since his days as a teacher at Stanford University, Fossel has studied aging from a medical and scientific perspective with a particular emphasis on premature aging syndromes such as progeria, and since at least 1996, when he gave the first talk at the NIH on the topic, he has been a strong and vocal advocate of telomerase therapy as a potential treatment of age-related diseases, disorders, and syndromes such as progeria, Alzheimer's disease, atherosclerosis, osteoporosis, cancer, and other age-related diseases. However, he is careful to qualify his advocacy of telomerase therapy as being a potential treatment for these conditions rather than a "cure for old age" and a panacea for age-related medical conditions, albeit a potential treatment that could radically extend the maximum human life span and reset the aging process in most people.

External links
Michael Fossel's website

References

1950 births
Living people
American scientists
Michigan State University faculty
Biogerontologists
Life extensionists
People from Greenwich, Connecticut
Phillips Exeter Academy alumni
Wesleyan University alumni
Stanford University School of Medicine alumni